Collins High School is a high school in Collins, Mississippi. It is a part of the Covington County School District. The student body is predominantly African American.

References

External links
 

Public high schools in Mississippi
Education in Covington County, Mississippi